Romain Bauchet (born 2 May 1994) is a French professional footballer who plays as a forward. He currently plays for US Saint-Omer.

Career statistics

References
 
 

1994 births
Living people
People from Saint-Omer
French footballers
Association football forwards
AS Nancy Lorraine players
SAS Épinal players
Ligue 2 players
Championnat National players
Sportspeople from Pas-de-Calais
Footballers from Hauts-de-France